Tsimafei Zhukouski (born 18 December 1989) is a Croatian professional volleyball player of Belarusian descent. He has been a member of the Croatia national team since 2009. As a player of Mladost Zagreb, he has won the Croatian Championship in 2007, 2008 and 2010, as well as two national cups in 2008 and 2009. At the professional club level, he plays for PSG Stal Nysa.

Honours
 CEV Champions League
  2017/2018 – with Cucine Lube Civitanova

 CEV Cup
  2015/2016 – with Berlin Recycling Volleys

 CEV Challenge Cup
  2009/2010 – with Mladost Zagreb

 National championships
 2006/2007  Croatian Championship, with Mladost Zagreb
 2007/2008  Croatian Cup, with Mladost Zagreb
 2007/2008  Croatian Championship, with Mladost Zagreb
 2008/2009  Croatian Cup, with Mladost Zagreb
 2009/2010  Croatian Cup, with Mladost Zagreb
 2009/2010  Croatian Championship, with Mladost Zagreb
 2015/2016  German Cup, with Berlin Recycling Volleys
 2015/2016  German Championship, with Berlin Recycling Volleys
 2016/2017  German Championship, with Berlin Recycling Volleys
 2017/2018  Italian Championship, with Cucine Lube Civitanova
 2019/2020  Italian SuperCup, with Sir Safety Conad Perugia

References

External links

 
 Player profile at LegaVolley.it 
 Player profile at PlusLiga.pl 
 Player profile at Volleybox.net 

1989 births
Living people
Sportspeople from Minsk
Croatian people of Belarusian descent
Croatian men's volleyball players
Croatian expatriate sportspeople in Italy
Expatriate volleyball players in Italy
Croatian expatriate sportspeople in Germany
Expatriate volleyball players in Germany
Croatian expatriate sportspeople in Russia
Expatriate volleyball players in Russia
Croatian expatriate sportspeople in Poland
Expatriate volleyball players in Poland
Stal Nysa players
Setters (volleyball)